Aram Wettroth Harrow (born 1980) is a professor of physics in the Massachusetts Institute of Technology's Center for Theoretical Physics.

Harrow works in quantum information science and quantum computing. Together with Avinatan Hassidim and Seth Lloyd, he designed a quantum algorithm for linear systems of equations, which in some cases exhibits an exponential advantage over the best classical algorithms. The algorithm has wide application in quantum machine learning.

He is a steering committee member of Quantum Information Processing (QIP), the largest annual conference in the field of quantum computing. Harrow is a co-administrator of SciRate, a free and open access scientific collaboration network. He also co-runs a blog, The Quantum Pontiff. His collaborators include Peter Shor and Charles H. Bennett.

Selected publications

References

External links

Living people
Quantum information scientists
American computer scientists
MIT Center for Theoretical Physics faculty
MIT Center for Theoretical Physics alumni
American physicists
1980 births
MIT Department of Physics alumni